William Wordsworth (1770–1850) was an English romantic poet.

Wordsworth may also refer to:

Places
 Wordsworth, Saskatchewan, a town in Canada

People 
 Wordsworth (rapper), an underground hip-hop artist
 Anthony Wordsworth (born 1989), an English footballer
 Barry Wordsworth (born 1948), a British conductor
 Charles Wordsworth, (1806–1892), bishop, son of Christopher Wordsworth (divine)
 Christopher Wordsworth (divine), (1774–1846), English divine and scholar, brother of William and Dorothy
 Christopher Wordsworth, (1807–1885), Bishop and man of Letters, son of Christopher Wordsworth (divine)
Dora Wordsworth, (1804–1847), daughter of William
 Dorothy Wordsworth (1771–1855), English poet and diarist, sister of William
Dame Elizabeth Wordsworth, (1840–1932), founder of Lady Margaret Hall, Oxford and St. Hugh's College, daughter of Christopher Wordsworth
Favel Wordsworth (1850-1888), American baseball player
John Wordsworth (scholar), (1805–1839), son of Christopher (divine)
 Jonathan Wordsworth, (1932–2006), academic, great-great-grandson of Christopher Wordsworth (divine)
 John Wordsworth, (1843–1911), Bishop, son of Christopher Wordsworth
Joshua Wordsworth, engineer, co-founder in 1812 of Taylor, Wordsworth and Co
 Matt Wordsworth (born 1975), Australian journalist and news presenter
Richard Wordsworth, (1915–1993), actor, great-great-grandson of William Wordsworth
Robert Wordsworth (1894-1984), British Indian Army officer and Australian politician 
Stephen Wordsworth (born 1955), former British diplomat
William Christopher Wordsworth (1878-1950), British academic and journalist in India
 William Wordsworth (composer) (1908–1988), an English-born Scottish composer

Art, entertainment, and media
 Wordsworth, a puppet character on the television show Wonder Showzen
Wordsworth Editions, British publisher

See also

 Words Worth, a Japanese adult role-playing video game

English-language surnames